In mathematics, a convex graph may be

a convex bipartite graph
a convex  plane graph
the graph of a convex function